Claudio Scarchilli (10 February 1924, Rome – 25 July 1992) was an Italian film actor who appeared in film throughout the 1960s. He acted in nearly twenty films within that decade.

He is best known in world cinema for his small roles in several of Sergio Leone's films, portraying Pedro, member of Tuco's gang, in the Spaghetti Western The Good, the Bad and the Ugly in 1966,  and Once Upon a Time in the West in 1968.  
 
His brother Sandro Scarchilli was also an actor and also appeared in The Good, the Bad and the Ugly in 1966.

He made his last appearance in 1970.

Selected filmography

Messalina (1960)
Pontius Pilate (1962) - Disma
The Golden Arrow (1962) - Bandit
Colossus of the Arena (1962)
Gladiator of Rome (1962) - Gladiator (uncredited)
The Fall of Rome (1963)
Anthar l'invincibile (1964)
Hercules, Prisoner of Evil (1964) - Lava
Giants of Rome (1964)
Hercules and the Treasure of the Incas (1964) - Dance Hall Customer (uncredited)
Desafío en Río Bravo (1964)
La magnifica sfida (1965) - Alì, l'oste
Doc, Hands of Steel (1965) - Cantina Barman (uncredited)
Due mafiosi contro Al Capone (1966)
Wild, Wild Planet (1966) - Scientist on Planet Delfos
War of the Planets (1966)
For a Few Extra Dollars (1966) - Riggs Henchman
The Good, the Bad and the Ugly (1966) - Pedro, Mexican Peon
The Hellbenders (1966) - Indian Chief
Joe l'implacabile (1967) - Jack Foster
Bandidos (1967) - Vigonza Henchman (uncredited)
Tutto per tutto (1968) - Diego, Carranza's Man
Cost of Dying (1968)
Once Upon a Time in the West (1968) - Member of Frank's Gang (uncredited)
A Noose for Django (1969) - Old Mexican (uncredited)
Chuck Moll (1970) - Saloon Brawler (uncredited)
Viva Cangaceiro (1970)
Rough Justice (1970) - Juan's Foster Father (uncredited)
Compañeros (1970)
Quel maledetto giorno della resa dei conti (1971) - (final film role)

External links
 

1924 births
1992 deaths
Male actors from Rome
Italian male film actors
20th-century Italian male actors
Male Spaghetti Western actors